, also known as , was a Japanese daimyō of the early Edo period.

The Makino were identified as one of the fudai or insider daimyō clans which were hereditary vassals or allies of the Tokugawa clan, in contrast with the tozama or outsider clans.

Makino clan genealogy
The fudai Makino clan originated in 16th century Mikawa Province. Their elevation in status by Toyotomi Hideyoshi dates from 1588.  They claim descent from Takechiuchi no Sukune, who was a legendary Statesman   and lover of the legendary Empress Jingū.

Hideshige was part of a cadet branch of the Makino which was created in 1633.  The Makino were installed at Sekiyado Domain in Shimōsa Province in 1644.  From 1668 through the Meiji Restoration, the descendants had holdings at Tanabe Domain (35,000 koku) in Tango Province.  Descendants lived from 1634 through 1868 at Mineyama Domain (11,000 koku) in Echigo Province.

The head of this clan line was ennobled as a "Viscount" in the Meiji period.

Tokugawa official
Hideshige served the Tokugawa shogunate as its seventeenth Kyoto shoshidai in the period spanning January 28, 1725 through July 6, 1734.

Notes

References
 Appert, Georges and H. Kinoshita. (1888).  Ancien Japon. Tokyo: Imprimerie Kokubunsha.
 Meyer, Eva-Maria. (1999).  Japans Kaiserhof in de Edo-Zeit: Unter besonderer Berücksichtigung der Jahre 1846 bis 1867. Münster: Tagenbuch. 
 Papinot, Edmond. (1906) Dictionnaire d'histoire et de géographie du japon. Tokyo: Librarie Sansaisha...Click link for digitized 1906 Nobiliaire du japon (2003)
 Sasaki Suguru. (2002). Boshin sensō: haisha no Meiji ishin. Tokyo: Chūōkōron-shinsha.
 Tōhō Gakkai. (1994).  Transactions of the International Conference of Orientalists in Japan. Tokyo: Tōhō Gakkai (Institute of Eastern Culture).

External links
 "Sekiyado-han" on Edo 300 HTML (22 February  2008)

|-

Daimyo
Makino clan
Kyoto Shoshidai
1671 births
1741 deaths